Szczaniec  is a village in Świebodzin County, Lubusz Voivodeship, in western Poland. It is the seat of the gmina (administrative district) called Gmina Szczaniec.

The village has a population of 1,473.

References

Szczaniec